Blockland may refer to:

 Blockland, Bremen, Germany
 Blockland (video game), a game from 2004/2007.

See also
 Blokland (disambiguation)